Leon Clarke (born 1985) is an English footballer.

Leon Clark(e) may also refer to:

 Leon Clarke (American football) (1933–2009), American football player
 Leon Pierce Clark (1870–1933), American psychiatrist and psychoanalyst
 Leon Clark (basketball), American basketball player

See also
 William Leon Clark (1911–2005), Deputy Chief of Chaplains of the United States Air Force